Iodopropynyl Butyl Carbamate (IPBC) is a water-soluble preservative used globally in the paints & coatings, wood preservatives, personal care, and cosmetics industries. IPBC is a member of the carbamate family of biocides. IPBC was invented in the 1970s and has a long history of effective use as an antifungal technology.

History
IPBC was initially developed for use in the paint & coatings industry as a dry-film preservative to protect interior and exterior coatings from mold, mildew, and fungal growth, while also offering cost performance and sustainability benefits. IPBC exhibits efficacy against a broad spectrum of fungal species, typically at very low use levels. IPBC today is incorporated into a wide variety of interior and exterior paint formulations around the world.

Use is restricted in some countries due to its toxicity, especially acute inhalation toxicity. IPBC is also becoming recognized as a contact allergen.

Uses
IPBC is an effective fungicide at very low concentrations in cosmetic and other products, and has shown very low sensitivity in humans tested with this preservative. IPBC was approved in 1996 for use up to 0.1% concentrations in topical products and cosmetics. However, this preservative is mostly found in cosmetics at about one-eighth that level [Maier et al., 2009].  
IPBC Toxicity and Safety Tests show it to be generally safe: When used properly in leave-on skin products, IPBC is extremely safe [Steinberg, 2002]. Previous to being approved for cosmetic use in 1996, extensive safety and toxicity tests were conducted on IPBC and their results were gathered along with earlier studies in a report of the Safety Assessment of IPBC by the Cosmetic Ingredient Review [CIR Final Report, Lanigan 1998]. This final report found IPBC to be a non-carcinogen with no genotoxicity and in reproductive and developmental toxicity studies using rats and mice, IPBC had no significant effect on fertility, reproductive performance, or on the incidence of fetal malformation [Lanigan, 1998].

Toxicity
The study, "Final Report on the Safety Assessment of Iodopropynyl Butylcarbamate", discusses the results of 32 studies between 1990 and 1994 in 3,582 subjects using skin application of IPBC at relevant concentrations.

All 32 studies showed no evidence of contact sensitization compared to placebo controls, with the report stating "With each test formulation, a few panelists had erythema, edema, and/or a papular response, but overall, the results were negative." In addition, the study mentions two skin sensitivity studies on 183 children ages 3 – 12 yrs which showed no adverse effects as well as no significant irritation from IPBC. 

Since the early safety report, there have been a few reports of human skin sensitivity to IPBC in individual patients – all of which showed complete recovery after discontinuance of use of any product containing the IPBC which was presumably an allergen for these patients [Toholka & Nixon, 2014; Pazzaglia & Tosti, 1999].  

Post-1996 tests of human sensitivity to IPBC have all shown quite low sensitivity, having overall reported human skin testing (patch test) on 53,774 subjects with only 491 of those subjects showing any reaction (0.8%) to IPBC. In every study, positive patch test reactions occurred in less than 1% of subjects tested in all but one study. This is a very low reaction rate, but it is not zero, and the industry reports this low rate of reaction even though in the largest study of 25,435 subjects over 69% of the reactions were either weak or doubtful [Warshaw et al., 2013a]. 

These combined studies showing prevalence of reaction below 1% means that IPBC at this time does not have the reaction rates necessary to be included as an allergen in standard allergy series. But, it remains under close monitoring as it is a relatively new preservative for cosmetic products and will presumably increase in usage [Sasseville, 2004].

Most human patch tests performed before 2004 were with 0.1% IPBC solutions, i.e. 10 times the concentration used in many cosmetic products. Some used 0.5% IPBC. In 2004, it was suggested that a better concentration for tests of this substance would be 0.2% [Brasch et al., 2004] and this has contributed to the diagnosis of more sensitizations to this substance [Martin-Gorgojo & Johansen, 2013].  One study showed significantly increased sensitivity between 2005 and 2010 using 0.5% IPBC in patch tests [Warshaw et al., 2013b].

See also 
Ingredients of cosmetics

References

Sources

Steinberg, D. C. (2002). "Iodopropynyl butylcarbamate as a preservative." Am J Contact Dermat 13(4): 207-208.

Toholka, R. and R. Nixon (2014). "Suspected allergic contact dermatitis to iodopropynyl butylcarbamate in an alcohol hand rub commonly used in Australian health-care settings." Australas J Dermatol 55(1): 70-71.

External links
  

Carbamates
Preservatives
Cosmetics chemicals
Organoiodides
Alkyne derivatives